Stéphane Tanguy (born January 31, 1975 in Brest) is a French former professional football player.

He played on the professional level in Ligue 1 for SM Caen and Ligue 2 for Stade Brestois 29, SM Caen and ES Wasquehal.

His brother Arnaud Tanguy played in Ligue 1 for SM Caen as well.

1975 births
Living people
French footballers
Ligue 1 players
Ligue 2 players
Stade Brestois 29 players
Stade Malherbe Caen players
Louhans-Cuiseaux FC players
AS Cherbourg Football players
Association football defenders
Wasquehal Football players